Cifax Rural Historic District is a national historic district located near Cifax, Bedford County, Virginia. It encompasses 51 contributing buildings, 7 contributing sites, and 2 contributing structures.  The district includes the
dwellings and outbuildings of prominent families, the houses of the poor and middling farmers and the laborers who in part depended on them for employment, and the stores, schools, and churches that served them.  Notable buildings include the Dillard-Coffey House, Logwood-Williams House, Old Nazareth
Methodist Episcopal Church, Poplar Springs Baptist Church, Cifax School, The Cedars, Noell-Lankford House, Poindexter-Ellett-Higginbotham Farm, and Glen Alpine designed by architect Pendleton S. Clark with landscaping by Charles F. Gillette.

It was listed on the National Register of Historic Places in 1992.

References

Historic districts in Bedford County, Virginia
National Register of Historic Places in Bedford County, Virginia
Historic districts on the National Register of Historic Places in Virginia